Sonpur Community development block (C.D.Block; Hindi: सोनपुर सामुदायिक विकास प्रखंड) is a rural area earmarked for administration and development in Saran district. The area is administered by a Block Development Officer. It is the second largest Block of Saran district in terms of population. A community development block covers several gram panchayats, Panchayat Samiti (Block), Primary Agricultural Co-operative societies (PACS) and other local administrative unit at the village level. It is represented by Sonpur Vidhan Sabha constituency in Bihar Legislative Assembly and Saran Lok Sabha constituency in Indian parliament.
Currently, C.D.Blocks are administrative units of 3rd level in Bihar state of India (equal to Tehsil in other states). Sonpur nagar panchayat was established in 2002. The civic body election in Sonpur nagar panchayat was held in May 2017. The term of office-bearers is for 5 years.

The real estate land prices soared in Sonepur after the start of construction of Digha–Sonpur rail–cum–road bridge in 2002. Real estate companies like RAV solutions pvt. ltd, tcw realty pvt ltd, Phenomenal Projects are acquiring large chunk of land and selling it by dividing those into small plots. Sonpur Block(प्रखण्ड) has 98 villages. Sonpur Sub-division(अनुमंडल) consists of Sonepur, Parsa, Garkha, Dighwara, Dariapur blocks. Sonpur Block has 23 Village Panchayats and 73 villages.

Demographics 

Sonpur Block of Saran district has population of 232,340(2011 census). 14% people lives in Urban areas while 86% lives in the Rural areas. Currently there are 20 community development blocks in the district. As of Ministry of Drinking Water and Sanitation 2009 report and 2011 Census, these were the findings.

Gram Panchayats

Sonpur block has 1 Nagar Panchayat and 23 Gram Panchayats. Number of villages is 116.
They are:

 Dumri Bujurg
 Hasilpur
 Nayagaon
 Rasulpur
 Gopalpur
 Chaturpur
 Parmanandpur
 Govindchak
 Saidpur
 Kasmar
 Kharika
 Gangajal
 Bharpura
 Shahpur Diyara
 Jahangirpur
 Dudhaila
 Shikarpur village, Saran district
 Kalyanpur village, Saran district
 Najarmira
 Sabalpur Uttari
 Sabalpur Pashchimi
 Sabalpur Madhyavarti
 Sabalpur Purvi

References 

Community development blocks in Saran district